Justin Michel (born 28 August 1995) is a Bonaire footballer who currently plays college soccer for Southeastern University Fire, and the Bonaire national football team.

Career

Youth and college
In 2013 Michel was being eyed by Dutch club FC Utrecht. In May 2014, Michel committed to playing college soccer for the Southeastern University Fire of Southeastern University in Florida, United States. He made six and two appearances for the team in his freshman and sophomore seasons, respectively.

Professional
Since 2013, Michel has played for S.V. Uruguay of the Bonaire League.

International
In 2014, Michel was included in the squad for Bonaire's 2014 Caribbean Cup qualification campaign. The matches were Bonaire's first competitive games since becoming members of CONCACAF and the Caribbean Football Union in 2013. He made his debut on 1 June 2015 coming on as a 43rd-minute substitute for Yurick Seinpaal in a 2–1 victory against the United States Virgin Islands.

References

External links
 
 Caribbean Football Database profile
 
 Southeastern Fire profile

Living people
Association football forwards
Bonaire international footballers
Bonaire footballers
Expatriate soccer players in the United States
1995 births